Park Young-sook (also known as Sally Park) (born 4 August 1960) is a South Korean former archer, archery judge and current coach.

Archery competitor

Park won a gold medal at the World Archery Championships in 1979 in the women's team event and a silver medal in the same event two years later.

She won a gold medal at the 1982 Asian Games along with Kim Jin-ho and Kim Mi-young.

At the 1984 Summer Olympic Games she came seventeenth with 2445 points scored in the women's individual event. Park retired in 1987 after a shoulder injury.

After retirement

She coached the Italian recurve women's team to the gold medal at the World Archery Championships in 2011. Park moved on to coach the South Korean youth team and Singapore team. She coached Areneo David and he became Malawi's first Olympian in archery in 2016.

Park received the World Archery Women's Award 2017.

Park became head coach of the Bhutan national team in 2018.

References

External links 
 Profile on worldarchery.org

1960 births
Living people
South Korean female archers
Olympic archers of South Korea
Archers at the 1984 Summer Olympics
World Archery Championships medalists
Asian Games medalists in archery
Archers at the 1982 Asian Games
Medalists at the 1982 Asian Games
Asian Games gold medalists for South Korea
20th-century South Korean women
21st-century South Korean women